The Council of Luxembourg was the central institution in the government of the Duchy of Luxembourg from 1444 to 1795, in direct descent from the medieval council of the dukes. It was a body that had both administrative and judicial authority. The council was reorganized by Charles V in 1531–1532. Until 1782, legal decisions of the council could be appealed to the Great Council of Mechelen. On 1 August 1782 the council was made "sovereign", that is, the highest court in its jurisdiction.

The council was abolished on 7 June 1795.

References

Further reading
M. Bourguignon, Inventaires du Conseil de Luxembourg, 2 vols. (Brussels, 1961).
M.N.J. Leclercq, Coutumes des Pays, Duché de Luxembourg et Comté de Chiny, vol. 2 (Brussels, 1869), 84-166.
N. Majerus, Histoire du droit dans le Grand-Duché de Luxembourg, vol. 2 (Luxembourg, 1949), pp. 394–399, 687–688.
R. Petit, "Le Conseil des Comtes de Luxembourg des origines au début du XIVe siècle", Revue du Nord 39 (1957), 164–165.
N. Van Werveke, "Notice sur le Conseil Provincial de Luxembourg avant sa réorganisation par Charles Quint (c. 1200-1531)", Publ. Sect. Hist. Inst. Lux., vol. 40 (1888), 253–382.
R. Warlomont, "Le Conseil provincial de justice du Luxembourg de 1531 à 1785", Standen en Landen 15 (1958), 108–124.

Legal history of Belgium
Early Modern Luxembourg
Defunct courts
Duchy of Luxembourg
1440s establishments in the Burgundian Netherlands
15th century in Luxembourg
1795 disestablishments in the Southern Netherlands
18th-century disestablishments in Luxembourg
Lu
Courts and tribunals established in 1444
Courts and tribunals disestablished in 1795